Gin is a distilled alcoholic drink that derives its flavour from juniper berries and other botanical ingredients.

Gin originated as a medicinal liquor made by monks and alchemists across Europe, particularly in southern Italy, Flanders and the Netherlands, to provide aqua vita from distillates of grapes and grains. It then became an object of commerce in the spirits industry. Gin became popular in England after the introduction of jenever, a Dutch and Belgian liquor that was originally a medicine. Although this development had been taking place since the early 17th century, gin became widespread after the 1688 Glorious Revolution led by William of Orange and subsequent import restrictions on French brandy. Gin subsequently emerged as the national alcoholic drink of England.

Gin today is produced in different ways from a wide range of herbal ingredients, giving rise to a number of distinct styles and brands. After juniper, gin tends to be flavoured with herbs, spices, floral or fruit flavours, or often a combination. It is commonly consumed mixed with tonic water in a gin and tonic. Gin is also often used as a base spirit to produce flavoured, gin-based liqueurs, for example sloe gin, traditionally produced by the addition of fruit, flavourings and sugar.

Etymology

The name gin is a shortened form of the older English word genever, related to the French word  and the Dutch word .

History

Origin: 11th and 13th-century mentions

The earliest known written reference to jenever appears in the 13th-century encyclopaedic work  (Bruges), with the earliest printed recipe for jenever dating from 16th-century work  (Antwerp).

Gin's roots can be further traced to 11th-century Benedictine monks in Salerno, in southern Italy, to a monastery surrounded by an area rich in juniper trees. These monks used a swan-necked alembic still. The monks used it to distill sharp, fiery, alcoholic tonics, one of which was distilled from wine infused with juniper berries. They were making medicines, hence the juniper. As a medicinal herb, juniper had been an essential part of doctors' kits for centuries: the Romans burned juniper branches for purification, and plague doctors stuffed the beaks of their plague masks with juniper to supposedly protect them from the Black Death. Across Europe, apothecaries handed out juniper tonic wines for coughs, colds, pains, strains, ruptures and cramps. These were a popular cure-all, though some thought these tonic wines to be a little too popular, and consumed for enjoyment rather than medicinal purposes.

17th century

The physician Franciscus Sylvius has been falsely credited with the invention of gin in the mid-17th century, although the existence of jenever is confirmed in Philip Massinger's play The Duke of Milan (1623), when Sylvius would have been about nine years old. It is further claimed that English soldiers who provided support in Antwerp against the Spanish in 1585, during the Eighty Years' War, were already drinking jenever for its calming effects before battle, from which the term Dutch courage is believed to have originated. According to some unconfirmed accounts, gin originated in Italy.

By the mid-17th century, numerous small Dutch and Flemish distillers had popularized the re-distillation of malted barley spirit or malt wine with juniper, anise, caraway, coriander, etc., which were sold in pharmacies and used to treat such medical problems as kidney ailments, lumbago, stomach ailments, gallstones, and gout. Gin emerged in England in varying forms by the early 17th century, and at the time of the Stuart Restoration, enjoyed a brief resurgence. Gin became vastly more popular as an alternative to brandy, when William III, II and I and Mary II became co-sovereigns of England, Scotland and Ireland after leading the Glorious Revolution. Particularly in crude, inferior forms, it was more likely to be flavoured with turpentine. Historian Angela McShane has described it as a "Protestant drink" as its rise was brought about by a Protestant king, fuelling his armies fighting the Catholic Irish and French.

18th century

Gin drinking in England rose significantly after the government allowed unlicensed gin production, and at the same time imposed a heavy duty on all imported spirits such as French brandy. This created a larger market for poor-quality barley that was unfit for brewing beer, and in 1695–1735 thousands of gin-shops sprang up throughout England, a period known as the Gin Craze. Because of the low price of gin, when compared with other drinks available at the same time, and in the same geographic location, gin began to be consumed regularly by the poor. Of the 15,000 drinking establishments in London, not including coffee shops and drinking chocolate shops, over half were gin shops. Beer maintained a healthy reputation as it was often safer to drink the brewed ale than unclean plain water. Gin, though, was blamed for various social problems, and it may have been a factor in the higher death rates which stabilized London's previously growing population. The reputation of the two drinks was illustrated by William Hogarth in his engravings Beer Street and Gin Lane (1751), described by the BBC as "arguably the most potent anti-drug poster ever conceived". The negative reputation of gin survives today in the English language, in terms like gin mills or the American phrase gin joints to describe disreputable bars, or gin-soaked to refer to drunks. The epithet mother's ruin is a common British name for gin, the origin of which is the subject of ongoing debate.

The Gin Act 1736 imposed high taxes on retailers and led to riots in the streets. The prohibitive duty was gradually reduced and finally abolished in 1742. The Gin Act 1751 was more successful, however; it forced distillers to sell only to licensed retailers and brought gin shops under the jurisdiction of local magistrates. Gin in the 18th century was produced in pot stills, and was somewhat sweeter than the London gin known today.

In London in the early 18th century, much gin was distilled legally in residential houses (there were estimated to be 1,500 residential stills in 1726) and was often flavoured with turpentine to generate resinous woody notes in addition to the juniper. As late as 1913, Webster's Dictionary states without further comment, "'common gin' is usually flavoured with turpentine".

Another common variation was to distill in the presence of sulfuric acid. Although the acid itself does not distil, it imparts the additional aroma of diethyl ether to the resulting gin. Sulfuric acid subtracts one water molecule from two ethanol molecules to create diethyl ether, which also forms an azeotrope with ethanol, and therefore distils with it. The result is a sweeter spirit, and one that may have possessed additional analgesic or even intoxicating effects – see Paracelsus.

Dutch or Belgian gin, also known as jenever or genever, evolved from malt wine spirits, and is a distinctly different drink from later styles of gin. Schiedam, a city in the province of South Holland, is famous for its jenever-producing history. The same for Hasselt in the Belgian province of Limburg. The oude (old) style of jenever remained very popular throughout the 19th century, where it was referred to as Holland or Geneva gin in popular, American, pre-Prohibition bartender guides.

The 18th century gave rise to a style of gin referred to as Old Tom gin, which is a softer, sweeter style of gin, often containing sugar. Old Tom gin faded in popularity by the early 20th century.

19th–20th centuries

The invention and development of the column still (1826 and 1831) made the distillation of neutral spirits practical, thus enabling the creation of the "London dry" style that evolved later in the 19th century.

In tropical British colonies gin was used to mask the bitter flavour of quinine, which was the only effective anti-malarial compound. Quinine was dissolved in carbonated water to form tonic water; the resulting cocktail is gin and tonic, although modern tonic water contains only a trace of quinine as a flavouring. Gin is a common base spirit for many mixed drinks, including the martini. Secretly produced "bathtub gin" was available in the speakeasies and "blind pigs" of Prohibition-era America as a result of the relatively simple production.

Sloe gin is traditionally described as a liqueur made by infusing sloes (the fruit of the blackthorn) in gin, although modern versions are almost always compounded from neutral spirits and flavourings. Similar infusions are possible with other fruits, such as damsons. Another popular gin-based liqueur with a longstanding history is Pimm's No.1 Cup (25% alcohol by volume(ABV)), which is a fruit cup flavoured with citrus and spices.

The National Jenever Museums are located in Hasselt in Belgium, and Schiedam in the Netherlands.

21st century

Since 2013, gin has been in a period of ascendancy worldwide, with many new brands and producers entering the category leading to a period of strong growth, innovation and change. More recently gin-based liqueurs have been popularised, reaching a market outside that of traditional gin drinkers, including fruit-flavoured and usually coloured "Pink gin", rhubarb gin, Spiced gin, violet gin, blood orange gin and sloe gin. Surging popularity and unchecked competition has led to consumer's conflation of gin with gin liqueurs and many products are straddling, pushing or breaking the boundaries of established definitions in a period of genesis for the industry.

Legal definition

Geographical indication 

Some legal classifications (protected denomination of origin) define gin as only originating from specific geographical areas without any further restrictions (e.g. Plymouth gin (PGI now lapsed), Ostfriesischer Korngenever, Slovenská borovička, Kraški Brinjevec, etc.), while other common descriptors refer to classic styles that are culturally recognised, but not legally defined (e.g. Old Tom gin). Sloe gin is also worth mentioning, as although technically a gin-based liqueur, it is unique in that the EU spirit drink regulations stipulate the colloquial term 'sloe gin' can legally be used without the "liqueur" suffix when certain production criteria are met.

Canada 

According to the Canadian Food and Drug Regulation, gin is produced through redistillation of alcohol from juniper berries or a mixture of more than one such redistilled food products. The Canadian Food and Drug Regulation recognises gin with three different definitions (Genever, Gin, London or Dry gin) that loosely approximate the US definitions. Whereas a more detailed regulation is provided for Holland gin or genever, no distinction is made between compounded gin and distilled gin. Either compounded or distilled gin can be labelled as Dry Gin or London Dry Gin if it does not contain any sweetening agents. For Genever and Gin, they shall not contain more than two percent sweetening agents.

European Union 

Although many different styles of gin have evolved, it is legally differentiated into four categories in the European Union, as follows.

Juniper-flavoured spirit drink 

Juniper-flavoured spirit drinks include the earliest class of gin, which is produced by pot distilling a fermented grain mash to moderate strength, e.g., 68% ABV, and then redistilling it with botanicals to extract the aromatic compounds. It must be bottled at a minimum of 30% ABV. Juniper-flavoured spirit-drinks may also be sold under the names Wacholder or Ginebra.

Gin 

Gin is a juniper-flavoured spirit made not via the redistillation of botanicals, but by simply adding approved natural flavouring substances to a neutral spirit of agricultural origin. The predominant flavour must be juniper. Minimum bottled strength is 37.5% ABV.

Distilled gin 

Distilled gin is produced exclusively by redistilling ethanol of agricultural origin with an initial strength of 96% ABV (the azeotrope of water and ethanol) in stills traditionally used for gin, in the presence of juniper berries and of other natural botanicals, provided that the juniper taste is predominant. Gin obtained simply by adding essences or flavourings to ethanol of agricultural origin is not distilled gin. Minimum bottled strength is 37.5% ABV.

London gin 

London gin may not contain added sweetening exceeding  of sugars per litre of the final product, nor colourants, nor any added ingredients other than water. The predominant flavour must be juniper. The term London gin may be supplemented by the term dry. Minimum bottled strength is 37.5% ABV.

United States

In the United States of America, "gin" is defined as an alcoholic beverage of no less than 40% ABV (80 proof) that possesses the characteristic flavour of juniper berries. Gin produced only through the redistillation of botanicals can be further distinguished and marketed as "distilled gin".

Production

Methods

Gin can be broadly differentiated into three basic styles reflecting modernization in its distillation and flavouring techniques:

Pot distilled gin represents the earliest style of gin, and is traditionally produced by pot distilling a fermented grain mash (malt wine) from barley or other grains, then redistilling it with flavouring botanicals to extract the aromatic compounds. A double gin can be produced by redistilling the first gin again with more botanicals. Due to the use of pot stills, the alcohol content of the distillate is relatively low; around 68% ABV for a single distilled gin or 76% ABV for a double gin. This type of gin is often aged in tanks or wooden casks, and retains a heavier, malty flavour that gives it a marked resemblance to whisky. Korenwijn (grain wine) and the oude (old) style of Geneva gin or Holland gin represent the most prominent gins of this class.

Column distilled gin evolved following the invention of the Coffey still, and is produced by first distilling high proof (e.g. 96% ABV) neutral spirits from a fermented mash or wash using a refluxing still such as a column still. The fermentable base for this spirit may be derived from grain, sugar beets, grapes, potatoes, sugar cane, plain sugar, or any other material of agricultural origin. The highly concentrated spirit is then redistilled with juniper berries and other botanicals in a pot still. Most often, the botanicals are suspended in a "gin basket" positioned within the head of the still, which allows the hot alcoholic vapours to extract flavouring components from the botanical charge. This method yields a gin lighter in flavour than the older pot still method, and results in either a distilled gin or London dry gin, depending largely upon how the spirit is finished.

Compound gin is made by compounding (blending) neutral spirits with essences, other natural flavourings, or ingredients left to infuse in neutral spirit without redistillation.

Flavouring 

Popular botanicals or flavouring agents for gin, besides the required juniper, often include citrus elements, such as lemon and bitter orange peel, as well as a combination of other spices, which may include any of anise, angelica root and seed, orris root, cardamom, pine needles and cone, licorice root, cinnamon, almond, cubeb, savory, lime peel, grapefruit peel, dragon eye (longan), saffron, baobab, frankincense, coriander, grains of paradise, nutmeg, cassia bark or others. The different combinations and concentrations of these botanicals in the distillation process cause the variations in taste among gin products.

Chemical research has begun to identify the various chemicals that are extracted in the distillation process and contribute to gin's flavouring. For example, juniper monoterpenes come from juniper berries. Citric and berry flavours come from chemicals such as limonene and gamma-terpinene linalool found in limes, blueberries and hops amongst others. Floral notes come from compounds such as geraniol and euganol. Spice-like flavours come from chemicals such as sabinene, delta-3-carene, and para-cymene.

In 2018, more than half the growth in the UK Gin category was contributed by flavoured gin.

Consumption

Classic gin cocktails 

A well known gin cocktail is the martini, traditionally made with gin and dry vermouth. Several other notable gin-based drinks include:

20th Century
Aviation
Bee's Knees 
Bloody Margaret
Fallen Angel
French 75
Gibson
Gimlet
Gin and tonic
Gin Fizz
Gin Rickey
Lonkero
Moon River
Negroni
Old Etonian
Pink Gin
Ramos Gin Fizz
Singapore Sling
The Last Word
Tom Collins
Vesper
White Lady

Notable brands

Archie Rose Distilling Co. – Sydney microdistillery
Aviation American Gin – Oregon, US, one of the early New Western style gins
Beefeater – England, first produced in 1820
BOLS Damrak – Netherlands, jenever
The Botanist – Hebridean island of Islay, Scotland, made with 31 botanicals, 22 being native to the island
Blackwood's – Scotland
Bombay Sapphire – England, distilled with ten botanicals
Boodles British Gin – England
Booth's Gin – England
Broker's Gin – England
Catoctin Creek – organic gin from Virginia, US
Citadelle – France
Cork Dry Gin – Ireland
Gilbey's – England
Gilpin's Westmorland Extra Dry Gin – England
Ginebra San Miguel – Philippines
Gordon's – England, first distilled in 1763
Greenall's – England 
Hendrick's Gin – Scotland, infused with flavours of cucumber and rose petal
Konig's Westphalian Gin – Germany
Leopolds Gin – Colorado, US
Masons Gin – North Yorkshire, England
Nicholson's – England, made in London from 1730
Plymouth – England, first distilled in 1793
Pickering's Gin – Scotland, from Edinburgh's first gin distillery in 150 years
Sacred Microdistillery – England, from one of London's new micro-distilleries
Seagram's – Quebec, Canada
Sipsmith – England
Smeets – Belgium, jenever
Steinhäger – Germany
St. George – California, US
Taaka – Louisiana, US
Tanqueray – England, first distilled in 1830
Uganda Waragi – Uganda, triple distilled Waragi
Vickers – South Australia
Whitley Neill Gin – England

See also

References

Further reading

External links

 EU definition original source – scroll down to paras: 20 nand 21 of Annex II – Spirit Drinks
 Gin news page – Alcohol and Drugs History Society
 Gin Palaces at The Dictionary of Victorian London
 New Western Style Gins at .drinkspirits.com
 Map of Scottish Gin Producers  at ginspiredscotland.com
History of Gin at Difford's Guide

 
Distilled drinks
Dutch inventions